Tom Patrizio Brewitt (born 11 February 1997) is an English professional footballer who plays as a defender for  club Swindon Town.

Club career
Born in Liverpool, Brewitt played youth football for Liverpool (where he spent 10 years, including serving as captain in the FA Youth Cup) and Middlesbrough. In October 2020 Brewitt admitted that when he was a Liverpool youth player he had deliberately injured his teammate Daniel Cleary in training to try and improve his own chances of being picked for the first team.

He signed for AFC Fylde in September 2018, after trialing for Walsall, Kilmarnock, and Málaga, before moving to Morecambe in June 2019. He was released by the club at the end of the 2019–20 season.

In March 2021 he signed for American team Tacoma Defiance.

Brewitt signed with USL Championship side Hartford Athletic on 2 February 2022.

Brewitt signed for Swindon Town on 7 March 2023 on a deal until the end of the season.

International career
Brewitt represented England at under-17 youth international level.

Personal life
Brewitt has American citizenship through his mother.

References

1997 births
Living people
English footballers
England youth international footballers
Association football defenders
Liverpool F.C. players
Middlesbrough F.C. players
AFC Fylde players
Morecambe F.C. players
Tacoma Defiance players
Hartford Athletic players
Swindon Town F.C. players
English Football League players
USL Championship players
English expatriate footballers
English expatriates in the United States
Expatriate soccer players in the United States
English people of American descent